Adisak Duangsri (born May 18, 1985), simply known as Ting, is a Thai professional footballer who plays as a goalkeeper for a Thai League 1 club Lamphun Warrior. Adisak was also known for his ability as a free kick specialist.

Honour
 Lamphun Warriors
 Thai League 2 (1): 2021–22
 Thai League 3 (1): 2020–21

References

External links
 Adisak Duangsri at Goal

1985 births
Living people
Adisak Duangsri
Adisak Duangsri
Association football goalkeepers
Adisak Duangsri
Adisak Duangsri
Adisak Duangsri
Adisak Duangsri
Adisak Duangsri
Adisak Duangsri
Adisak Duangsri
Adisak Duangsri
Adisak Duangsri
Adisak Duangsri
Adisak Duangsri
Adisak Duangsri
Adisak Duangsri